A sleeved blanket is a body-length blanket with sleeves usually made of fleece or nylon material. It is similar in design to a bathrobe but is meant to be worn backwards (i.e., with the opening in the back). The product has been marketed by various brands but the Original company was  'Slanket' created by Gary Clegg then other companies like Snuggie, Snuggler, Doojo, Toasty Wrap, copying the brand later. It comes with varying sizes, colors and qualities of materials but similar basic design.

Popularity

In late 2008 and early 2009 the Snuggie brand of sleeved blankets became a pop culture phenomenon, sometimes described humorously as a "cult".

The product became famous after a direct response commercial promoting the product was aired. It was featured on television programs like Today where cast and crew donned Snuggie blankets for a segment which was described as looking like a Black Protestant choir. Others have described mass-snuggie wearing as looking like a Harry Potter convention. The Associated Press likened it to a "monk's ensemble in fleece" and proclaimed it the "ultimate kitsch gift". The Snuggie initially sold singly for $14.95, and later in sets of two for $19.95.

The Slanket was mentioned in an episode of NBC's 30 Rock entitled "The Ones". The product has also been ridiculed as a "backwards robe" or simple reinvention of the coat on radio and television talk shows in the United States.  Comparisons have also been made with the Thneed, a highly promoted, amorphous garment in the Dr. Seuss story, The Lorax.

On January 30, 2009, a group organized a pub crawl wearing Snuggies in Cincinnati, Ohio. In the following months they went on to complete over 40 more across the nation. Later, a group organized a Snuggie pub crawl in Chicago to raise money for an African orphanage, which led to similar events throughout the United States. An employee at Americans for Tax Reform, a conservative think tank, started a Facebook page called "The Snuggie Cult" and convinced fellow conservatives including Joe the Plumber, Tucker Carlson, and Andrew Breitbart to pose wearing the robes.

The phenomenon resulted in sales of the Snuggie and its rivals that far exceeded their distributors' expectations: more than 4 million Snuggies as of December 2009 and 1 million Slankets as of February 2009. The phenomenon has even resulted in variations such as "Snuggie for Dogs" and Snuggie with printed patterns.

Australian radio program Labby, Camilla & Stav on B105 tested the claim that one can wear a Snuggie at sporting events, such as a soccer game, a football game or a basketball game. To test this, Labby and Stav wore Snuggies to a State of Origin game. The test was successful. They also dressed a statue of Wally Lewis, which stands in front of Suncorp Stadium, in a Snuggie live on the air. Security guards found it amusing at first but it was removed shortly after.

In the summer of 2009, the Designer Snuggie was released to the public, as well as the Snuggie for Kids and the Snuggie for Dogs. 

On March 5, 2010, at a Cleveland Cavaliers game, Snuggie wearers broke a world record for sleeved blanket wearing. Over 22,500 fans wore custom-made, limited edition Cavaliers Snuggie blankets for 5 minutes. A Guinness World Records representative was on hand to present the official World Record certificate to KeyBank, the Cavaliers, and Snuggie.  However, in just a little over a month the feat was broken during a Los Angeles Angels of Anaheim home game when over 40,000 spectators wore a promotional Hideki Matsui sleeved blanket for five minutes.

In March 2018, Allstar Marketing Group, owner of the "Snuggie" brand, was fined $7.5 million by the US Federal Trade Commission for deceptive marketing and to provide refunds to deceived customers.

Parodies
Several hundred parodies of the commercial have appeared on YouTube, as well as numerous fan pages on Facebook. Mockings of the product and its commercial have also been made by comedians such as Daniel Tosh, Jay Leno, Ellen DeGeneres, Bill Maher, Jon Stewart, Whoopi Goldberg, Tim Burton, Loulogio (in Spain), Tim Hawkins, and on iCarly, as well as website parodies and Lacie and Olivia. Jack Douglass's YouTube parody, entitled "The WTF Blanket", has reached over 24 million views.

Commercial variations
The product was first commercialized as the Freedom Blanket.

The Slanket was created by Gary Clegg using a sleeping bag in Maine in 1998 (before the Snuggie). Clegg's mother made him a blanket with a single sleeve for use in his cold dorm room. Clegg later developed that into the Slanket with two sleeves.

The Snuggie sleeved blanket product has been sold in the United States, Canada, and Australia. It was marketed primarily through a memorable television commercial. As of January 2009, over 20 million of the product had been sold.

Germany markets an electric version of the Snuggie that has a control with four temperature settings. The company markets the Snuggie via its website and television commercials along with many other as-seen-on-TV products.

The Doojo sleeved blanket is a German product and its first prototype was created in 2005 by Darko Sulentic. Doojo is patented for all European countries and patent-pending in North America conditioned by its particular design of a sleeved blanket with integrated gloves. The product obtained already nine different awards for design and innovation and became extremely popular in Europe. Two additional colorful collections of blankets for babies and kids complete the range. 

Another well-known variant, the "Toasty Wrap", has been sold via infomercials hosted by Montel Williams as a method for saving on heating costs. However, based on the similarities of the Toasty Wrap's advertising to that of Snuggie, brandfreak.com suggests that it is probable that both brands originate with the same manufacturer.

The rock band Weezer released its own Snuggie blanket in November 2009; which is available in solid blue with the name "Weezer" on it in white font. It has been dubbed the "Wuggie".

It is sometimes marketed as a "comfy blanket".

A blanket called GO-GO Blanket holds the US patent for child-sized sleeved blankets. GO-GO Blanket was created as a travel blanket for children (up to size 5) which complies with federal safety regulations for car seats and strollers.  GO-GO Blankets were created in 2007, by a grandmother in New Jersey who wanted to find a solution to keeping children safe and warm in a car seat without bulky winter wear.  

There is also an Italian version sold in Europe, Canada, and Japan called the "Kanguru" with a pocket in the middle.

In 2017, a U.S. trade court ruled that the product should be classified as a blanket, rather than clothing, as government lawyers had been trying to claim. In the United States, the tariff on imported blankets is 8.5 percent, whereas the tariff on imported "pullover apparel" is significantly higher at 14.9 percent.

See also
Bathrobe
Blanket
Cloak
Hospital gown
Kitsch
Robe
Shawl

References

External links

The Slanket of Con

Gowns
History of clothing (Western fashion)
2000s fashion
2010s fashion
2000s fads and trends